Kristine Elisabeth Tånnander (born 21 November 1955) is a retired Swedish hepathlete. Together with her younger sister Annette she competed at the 1982 European Championships, 1983 World Championships and 1984 Summer Olympics and placed 11th–12th. She won the national titles in the 100 m hurdles (1976), pentathlon (1974–75 and 1978–79), heptathlon (1980–83 and 1985), 4 × 100 m relay (1980–82) and 4 × 200 m relay (1978 and 1981–82). Her father Kjell was an Olympic decathlete.

External links

References

1955 births
Living people
Athletes (track and field) at the 1984 Summer Olympics
Olympic athletes of Sweden
Swedish heptathletes
Sportspeople from Malmö